The History of Eric Clapton is a compilation double LP, released in 1972 by Polydor Records in the United Kingdom, and Atco Records in the United States. It features Eric Clapton performing in various bands between 1964 and 1970, including The Yardbirds, Cream, Blind Faith and Derek and the Dominos.

The compilation is notable for helping Clapton's career when he was battling heroin addiction and making the song "Layla" famous. It is also notable for being perhaps the first compilation in rock music to collect music of a single rock musician that spans time, bands, music styles and record labels.

The album cover picture was taken at George Harrison's Concert for Bangladesh while Clapton was playing "While My Guitar Gently Weeps" on a Gibson Byrdland hollow-body guitar.

Content
The album has two versions of "Tell the Truth", both different from and recorded before "Tell the Truth" on Layla and Other Assorted Love Songs (1970). "Tell the Truth" on this compilation is a fast up-beat version originally released as a single in July 1970, while "Tell the Truth – Jam" is a long and slow instrumental jam from the Layla sessions which had never been released before. The "Tell the Truth" single also appeared later on Crossroads (1988) and on Layla and Other Assorted Love Songs 40th Anniversary Deluxe and Super Deluxe Edition (2011). "Tell the Truth – Jam" was featured on The Layla Sessions: 20th Anniversary Edition (1990) as "Tell the Truth (Jam #1)"; a second "Tell the Truth" jam, also featured on The Layla Sessions, was unreleased at the time of The History of Eric Clapton compilation.

The U.S. release of this compilation replaced "Tales of Brave Ulysses" with "Tribute to Elmore", a Clapton and Jimmy Page homage to American blues musician Elmore James. "Tribute to Elmore" was one of several jams performed by Clapton, Page and Jeff Beck which were recorded by Page and released later without consulting Clapton or Beck.

Reception

In a review at AllMusic, Bruce Eder wrote that the tracks on The History of Eric Clapton "seemed boundless at the time", from the "primitive and straightforward" "I Ain't Got You" to "Layla" at, what was then, the end of his career. What Eder found extraordinary about this 11-song collection is that it, at the time, only covered two years of Clapton's solo career, but "still doesn't make a bad summation of his best work." He added that the "Tell the Truth" jam alone makes The History of Eric Clapton a "priority acquisition," even for Clapton diehards.

Robert Christgau was a little more critical of the album, saying that while it has several "worthwhile oddities" (the "Tell the Truth" single and its studio jam, plus King Curtis' "Teasin), he felt that there should have been more from the Yardbirds and the Bluesbreakers.

Reviewing the album in Journal-News in 1972, Michael O'Connor wrote that while many critics belittled the collection, calling it a "rehash" and a "ripoff", he felt that, despite its weaknesses and bad song selection, it is a good introduction to Eric Clapton, and "really isn't that bad a trip". O'Connor praised Clapton's work with Derek and the Dominos on side four, particularly the "Tell the Truth" jam, and concluded that the compilation "wets my appetite for a future album".

Track listing

UK tracks

US tracks

On the U.S. Atco LP SD2-803, track 3, "Tales of Brave Ulysses" is replaced with:

Track notes
A1 – from The Yardbirds Featuring Performances by Jeff Beck, Eric Clapton, Jimmy Page (1970); recorded September 1964
A2 – from Blues Breakers with Eric Clapton (1966); recorded April 1966
A3 (UK release) – from Disraeli Gears (1967); recorded May 1967
A3 (US release) – from Blues Anytime Vol. 1 (1968); recorded June 1965
A4 – from What's Shakin' (1966); recorded March 1966
A5 – from Disraeli Gears (1967); recorded May 1967
A6 – from Wheels of Fire (1968); recorded March 1968
B1 – from Wheels of Fire (1968); recorded March 1968
B2 – from Goodbye (1969); recorded October 1968
C1 – from Blind Faith (1969); recorded June 1969
C2 – from Delaney & Bonnie & Friends on Tour with Eric Clapton (1970); recorded December 1969
C3 – from Delaney & Bonnie & Friends on Tour with Eric Clapton (1970); recorded December 1969
C4 – from Get Ready (1970); recorded January 1970
C5 – from Eric Clapton (1970); recorded January 1970
D1 – "Tell the Truth" single (1970); recorded June 1970
D2 – previously unreleased; recorded August 1970
D3 – from Layla and Other Assorted Love Songs (1970); recorded August–September 1970

Charts

References

Works cited

External links 
LP sleeve artwork at FreeCovers.net (Internet Archive copy)

Eric Clapton compilation albums
1972 compilation albums
Polydor Records compilation albums
Atco Records compilation albums